This is a list of current and former members of al-Qaeda, including its branches around the globe. Little is known about the leadership or members because of the secretive nature of the organization.

Al-Qaeda Central (AQC)

Other individuals

See also
 055 Brigade
 Egyptian Islamic Jihad
 Islamic State
 List of Islamic State members

References

 
Al-Qaeda leaders
Terrorism-related lists
Lists of criminals